Denny Creek is a stream in the U.S. state of Missouri. It is a tributary to Deer Creek.

Denny Creek was named after Samuel J. Denny, a pioneer who owned land along its course in the 1810s.

References

Rivers of Missouri
Rivers of St. Louis County, Missouri